Juncus squarrosus, called goose corn, heath rush, and mosquito rush, is a species of flowering plant in the genus Juncus, native to Iceland, Europe, and Morocco, and introduced to Greenland, Svalbard, Tasmania, New Zealand, and the US state of Wisconsin. It is pollution-tolerant.

References

squarrosus
Flora of Europe
Flora of Morocco
Taxa named by Carl Linnaeus
Plants described in 1753